Isaiah Emmanuel Irving (born June 9, 1994) is an American football linebacker who is currently a free agent. He played college football at San Jose State.

Early life and college career
Born in Oakland, California, Irving was raised in Vacaville, California and Houston, Texas. He graduated from Cypress Creek High School in Houston in 2013.

Irving appeared in 47 games with 37 starts for the Spartans, recording 140 tackles, 23 TFLs, 11 sacks and 1 forced fumble. He was named honorable mention All-Mountain West as a senior and led the team in sacks.

Professional career

Chicago Bears
Irving signed with the Chicago Bears as an undrafted free agent on May 11, 2017. He was waived on September 2, 2017 and was signed to the Bears' practice squad the next day. He was promoted to the active roster on October 9, 2017. He was placed on injured reserve on December 2, 2017 with a knee injury.

In 2018, Irving appeared in 13 games, during which he recorded eight tackles and a sack, the latter of which came against Nathan Peterman of the Buffalo Bills. He was an exclusive-rights free agent after the 2018 season, but returned to the Bears after being tendered a contract on March 13, 2019, which he signed on April 15.

Irving re-signed with the Bears on a one-year contract on April 3, 2020. He was waived/injured on September 5, 2020, and subsequently reverted to the team's injured reserve list the next day. He was waived with an injury settlement on September 7.

Denver Broncos
On September 16, 2020, Irving was signed to the Denver Broncos practice squad.

Arizona Cardinals
On October 15, 2020, Irving was signed by the Arizona Cardinals off the Broncos practice squad. On October 27, 2020, Irving was placed on injured reserve after suffering a neck injury in Week 7.

References

External links
San Jose State Spartans bio
Chicago Bears bio

1994 births
Living people
Players of American football from Houston
People from Vacaville, California
Players of American football from Oakland, California
American football linebackers
San Jose State Spartans football players
Chicago Bears players
Denver Broncos players
Arizona Cardinals players